Bunching can refer to:

 Bunching (mathematics), also known as Muirhead's inequality.
 Bunching (animals), the practice of stealing pets for laboratories.
 Bus bunching, two or more transit vehicles running together despite evenly spaced scheduling
 Photon bunching, in physics, the statistical tendency for photons to arrive simultaneously at a detector

Within the Wikipedia community it can also refer to:
 A term for section edit buttons showing up after images or textboxes—see Wikipedia:How to fix bunched-up edit links.

See also
 Bunch (disambiguation)
 Bunch (surname)